MT-ND4 is a gene of the mitochondrial genome coding for the NADH-ubiquinone oxidoreductase chain 4 (ND4) protein. The ND4 protein is a subunit of NADH dehydrogenase (ubiquinone), which is located in the mitochondrial inner membrane and is the largest of the five complexes of the electron transport chain. Variations in the MT-ND4 gene are associated with age-related macular degeneration (AMD), Leber's hereditary optic neuropathy (LHON), mesial temporal lobe epilepsy (MTLE) and cystic fibrosis.

Structure 

The MT-ND4 gene is located in human mitochondrial DNA from base pair 10,760 to 12,137. The MT-ND4 gene produces a 52 kDa protein composed of 459 amino acids. MT-ND4 is one of seven mitochondrial genes encoding subunits of the enzyme NADH dehydrogenase (ubiquinone), together with MT-ND1, MT-ND2, MT-ND3, MT-ND4L, MT-ND5, and MT-ND6. Also known as Complex I, this enzyme is the largest of the respiratory complexes. The structure is L-shaped with a long, hydrophobic transmembrane domain and a hydrophilic domain for the peripheral arm that includes all the known redox centres and the NADH binding site. MT-ND4 and the rest of the mitochondrially encoded subunits are the most hydrophobic of the subunits of Complex I and form the core of the transmembrane region.

An unusual feature of the human MT-ND4 gene is the 7-nucleotide gene overlap of its first three codons (5'-ATG CTA AAA-3' coding for amino acids Met-Leu-Lys) with the last three codons of the MT-ND4L gene (5'-CAA TGC TAA-3' coding for Gln, Cys and Stop). With respect to the MT-ND4L reading frame (+1), the MT-ND4 gene starts in the +3 reading frame: [CAA][TGC][TAA]AA versus CA[ATG][CTA][AAA].

Function 

MT-ND4 is a subunit of the respiratory chain Complex I that is believed to belong to the minimal assembly of core proteins required to catalyze NADH dehydrogenation and electron transfer to ubiquinone (coenzyme Q10). Initially, NADH binds to Complex I and transfers two electrons to the isoalloxazine ring of the flavin mononucleotide (FMN) prosthetic arm to form FMNH2. The electrons are transferred through a series of iron-sulfur (Fe-S) clusters in the prosthetic arm and finally to coenzyme Q10 (CoQ), which is reduced to ubiquinol (CoQH2). The flow of electrons changes the redox state of the protein, resulting in a conformational change and pK shift of the ionizable side chain, which pumps four hydrogen ions out of the mitochondrial matrix.

Studies in cystic fibrosis cases suggest that MT-ND4 expression is indirectly upregulated by the cystic fibrosis transmembrane conductance regulator (CFTR) channel chloride transport activity. Channel flow double-electrode (CFDE) cells ectopically expressing wild-type CFTR channels were used to test the effect of CFTR chloride transport inhibitors glibenclamide and CFTR(inh)172 and demonstrated a reduction in MT-ND4 expression.

Clinical significance
MT-ND4 is one of five SNPs associated with age-related macular degeneration (AMD) in Mexican Americans.

Leber's hereditary optic neuropathy (LHON) correlates with a mutation in the MT-ND4 gene in multiple families. The mutation at codon 340 results in the elimination of an Sfa NI site by the conversion of a highly conserved arginine to a histidine. This provides a simple diagnostic test by which to identify LHON, a maternally inherited disease that results in optic nerve degeneration and cardiac dysrythmia.

Amino acid changes in MT-ND4, MT-ND5 and MT-ATP8 resulting from mutations at the 11994, 8502 and 13,231 bp of mtDNA are significantly correlated in mesial temporal lobe epilepsy (MTLE) patients with hippocampal sclerosis. The 11994 C>T mutation to the MT-ND4 gene results in a Thr to Ile shift at the 412 position. Genome analysis has never been used in MTLE cases and could provide another diagnostic method in the disease.

MT-ND4 is downregulated in cystic fibrosis, a disease that results from mutations in the cystic fibrosis transmembrane conductance regulator (CFTR) channel.

Interactions 
MT-ND4 has been shown to have 21 binary protein-protein interactions including 15 co-complex interactions. MT-ND4 appears to interact with SP1, ZNF16, CTCF, GRB2, and ATM.

References

Further reading

External links 
Mass spectrometry characterization of MT-ND4 at COPaKB 
 

Proteins
Human mitochondrial genes